Jan Broschinský (born 1 September 1985) is a Czech football midfielder who most recently played for Vlašim in the Czech 2. Liga. He represented his country at youth international level.

References

External links 
 

1985 births
Living people
Czech First League players
Czech Republic youth international footballers
Slovak Super Liga players
Association football midfielders
Czech footballers
FK Chmel Blšany players
FC Viktoria Plzeň players
SK Kladno players
FC Slovan Liberec players
FC Nitra players